Yiyuan (Wade-Giles: iyüan) is a county in the centre of China's Shandong province and is located in the deep Tai-yi Mountains, and is the southernmost county-level division under the jurisdiction of Zibo City. It had a population of 576,000 according to the county government, of which 104,200 lives in the county town. Yiyuan has the nickname of “Roof of Shandong” because of its highest average altitude among all counties within the province.

History 
Yiyuan county is home to a number of archaeological finds, particularly humanoid fossils. One such fossil, referred to as the "Yiyuan ape-man fossil" is estimated to date back between 400,000 and 500,000 years ago. Yiyuan people are also proud of local archeological findings from the Palæolithic and Neolithic Ages as well as cultural findings since the Shang Dynasty. The county is thought to be the setting for the famous Chinese legend of The Cowherd and the Weaver Girl. It is estimated by the county government that 23,000 people from Yiyuan fought during the Japanese Invasion of China. Of these 23,000 people, approximately 1,800 are thought to have died, with another 2,100 thought to be injured.

Geography 
The county town is located beside one of the most important rivers in the province- the Yi River, and the name "" literally means "the beginning of (the) Yi (River)".

Climate

Administrative divisions 
Yiyuan County is divided into 2 subdistricts and 10 towns.

Subdistricts 

Towns 

References

External links

Counties of Shandong
Zibo